The Bordentown Regional School District is a comprehensive regional public school district that serves students in pre-Kindergarten through twelfth grade from communities in Burlington County, New Jersey, United States. The district serves students from Bordentown City, Bordentown Township and Fieldsboro Borough.

As of the 2020–21 school year, the district, comprised of five schools, had an enrollment of 2,373 students and 194.0 classroom teachers (on an FTE basis), for a student–teacher ratio of 12.2:1.

The district is classified by the New Jersey Department of Education as being in District Factor Group "DE", the fifth highest of eight groupings. District Factor Groups organize districts statewide to allow comparison by common socioeconomic characteristics of the local districts. From lowest socioeconomic status to highest, the categories are A, B, CD, DE, FG, GH, I and J.

The New Hanover Township School District, consisting of non-military portions of New Hanover Township (including its Cookstown area) and Wrightstown Borough, sends students to Bordentown Regional High School on a tuition basis for grades 9-12 as part of a sending/receiving relationship that has been in place since the 1960s, with about 50 students from the New Hanover district being sent to the high school. As of 2011, the New Hanover district was considering expansion of its relationship to send students to Bordentown for middle school for grades 6-8.

History
In 1948, during de jure educational segregation in the United States, the district had a school for black children.

Edward Forsthoffer retired effective July 1, 2021, and was succeeded by Trudy Atkins.

Awards and recognition
Bordentown Regional High School was recognized by Governor Jim McGreevey in 2003 as one of 25 schools selected statewide for the First Annual Governor's School of Excellence award.

For the 2005-06 school year, Peter Muschal School was one of 22 schools statewide selected as Governor's School of Excellence Winners, an award given to schools that have demonstrated significant academic improvement over the previous two academic years.

Schools 
Schools in the district (with 2020–21 enrollment data from the National Center for Education Statistics) are:
Elementary schools
Clara Barton Elementary School with 235 students in grades K-2 (generally serves Bordentown City and the Holloway Meadows section of Bordentown Township)
Louisa Kenny, Principal
Peter Muschal Elementary School with 522 students in grades PreK-5 (generally serves remainder of Bordentown Township and the Borough of Fieldsboro)
Megan Geibel, Principal
MacFarland Intermediate School with 243 students in grades 3-5
Daniel Riether, Principal
Middle school
Bordentown Regional Middle School with 576 students in grades 6-8
Joseph F. Sprague, Principal
High school
Bordentown Regional High School with 766 students in grades 9-12
Robert Walder, Principal

Administration 
Core members of the district's administration are:
Dr. Trudy Atkins, Superintendent
Chifonda Henry, Business Administrator / Board Secretary

Board of education
The district's board of education is comprised of nine members who set policy and oversee the fiscal and educational operation of the district through its administration. As a Type II school district, the board's trustees are elected directly by voters to serve three-year terms of office on a staggered basis, with three seats up for election each year held (since 2012) as part of the November general election. The board appoints a superintendent to oversee the district's day-to-day operations and a business administrator to supervise the business functions of the district. The board's nine seats are allocated based on the population of the constituent municipalities, with six seats assigned to Bordentown Township, two seats to Bordentown City and one seat to Fieldsboro; a tenth, non-voting seat is assigned to New Hanover Township.

References

External links 
Bordentown Regional School District

Data for the Bordentown Regional School District, National Center for Education Statistics
Local Government Budget Review - Bordentown Regional School District: September 1999

Bordentown, New Jersey
Bordentown Township, New Jersey
Fieldsboro, New Jersey
New Jersey District Factor Group DE
School districts in Burlington County, New Jersey